In geometry, a Johnson solid is a strictly convex polyhedron, each face of which is a regular polygon, but which is not uniform, i.e., not a Platonic solid, Archimedean solid, prism or antiprism. In 1966, Norman Johnson published a list which included all 92 solids, and gave them their names and numbers. He did not prove that there were only 92, but he did conjecture that there were no others. Victor Zalgaller proved in 1969 that Johnson's list was complete.

Other polyhedra can be constructed that have only approximately regular planar polygon faces, and are informally called near-miss Johnson solids; there can be no definitive count of them.

The various sections that follow have tables listing all 92 Johnson solids, and values for some of their most important properties. Each table allows sorting by column so that numerical values, or the names of the solids, can be sorted in order.

Vertices, edges, faces, and symmetry

Legend:
 Jn – Johnson solid number
 Net – Flattened (unfolded) image
 V – Number of vertices
 E – Number of edges
 F – Number of faces (total)
 F3–F10 – Number of faces by side counts

The square pyramid  has the fewest vertices (5), the fewest edges (8), and the fewest faces (5).

The triaugmented truncated dodecahedron  has the most vertices (75) and the most edges (135). It also has the highest number of faces (62), along with the gyrate rhombicosidodecahedron , the parabigyrate rhombicosidodecahedron  , the metabigyrate rhombicosidodecahedron  , and the trigyrate rhombicosidodecahedron  .

Surface area
Since all faces of Johnson solids are regular polygons with 3, 4, 5, 6, 8, or 10 sides, and since all these polygons have the same edge length , the surface area of a Johnson solid can be calculated as 

is the area of a regular polygon with  sides of length . In terms of radicals, one has

resulting in the following table of surface areas.

For a fixed edge length, the triangular dipyramid  has the smallest surface area and the triaugmented truncated dodecahedron  has the largest, more than 40 times larger.

Volume

The following table lists the volume of each Johnson solid.

The source for this table is the PolyhedronData[..., "Volume"] command in Wolfram Research's Mathematica.

These volumes can be calculated from a set of vertex coordinates; such coordinates are known for all 92 Johnson solids. A conceptually simple approach is to triangulate the surface of the solid (for example, by adding an extra point in the center of each non-triangular face) and choose some interior point as an "origin" so that the interior can be subdivided into irregular tetrahedra. Each tetrahedron has one vertex at the origin inside and three vertices on the surface. The volume of the solid is then the sum of the volumes of these tetrahedra. There is a simple formula for the volume of an irregular tetrahedron.

For a fixed edge length, the square pyramid  and the triangular dipyramid  have the smallest volume and the triaugmented truncated dodecahedron  has the largest, more than 390 times larger.

These values are the greatest real root of the following polynomials.

Inradius, midradius, and circumradius

The following table lists the radius  of the insphere, the radius  of the midsphere, and the radius  of the circumsphere, each divided by the edge length , when these spheres exist.

A polyhedron does not necessarily have an insphere, or a midsphere, or a circumsphere. For example, it does not have a circumsphere unless all its vertices lie on some sphere. The Johnson solids, having less symmetry than, say, the Platonic solids, lack many of these spheres. Only  and  possess all three of these spheres.

The source for this table is the PolyhedronData[..., "Inradius"], PolyhedronData[..., "Midradius"], and PolyhedronData[..., "Circumradius"] commands in Wolfram Research's Mathematica. The output has been simplified to a consistent form in terms of radicals.

References
 Norman W. Johnson, "Convex Solids with Regular Faces", Canadian Journal of Mathematics, 18, 1966, pages 169–200. Contains the original enumeration of the 92 solids and the conjecture that there are no others.
   The first proof that there are only 92 Johnson solids.

External links
 Sylvain Gagnon, "Convex polyhedra with regular faces", Structural Topology, No. 6, 1982, 83-95.
 Johnson Solids by George W. Hart.
 Images of all 92 solids, categorized, on one page
 
 VRML models of Johnson Solids by Jim McNeill
 VRML models of Johnson Solids by Vladimir Bulatov

Mathematics-related lists